Stefanie de Roux Martin (born 5 August 1982) is a Panamanian model, TV host, and beauty pageant contestant. She is the winner of the 2002 Señorita Panamá pageant, and she competed in the Miss Universe 2003 pageant held in Panama City, Panama, where she was a semifinalist (Top 15).

Early life
De Roux's life in show business started at the age of 15 when she entered a charity fashion show to help cancer research. Soon after, she was approached by an agency and began modeling.  She graduated in Corporate Communications at Southern Methodist University (SMU) in Dallas, Texas. Stefanie is the current director of a model school.

Señorita Panamá 2002

De Roux is 5 ft 10 in (1.78 m) tall, and competed in and won the national beauty pageant Señorita Panamá 2002. She represented the state of Panamá Centro.

Miss Universe 2003
She represented Panama in the Miss Universe 2003 pageant held on Panama City, Panama where she was a semifinalist (Top 15)

Miss Earth 2006
She also was the representative of her country on the Miss Earth 2006 beauty pageant, held on 26 November 2006 in Manila, Philippines. She placed in the top eight and came in fifth place.

After her placement as finalist in the 2006 edition of Miss Earth, she was included in the list of distinguished alumni of the Southern Methodist University.

References

External links
 Video of Stefanie on swimsuit at Miss Universe 2003
 Pageant Almanac list of semifinalists
 Miss Earth official website

1982 births
Living people
Miss Earth 2006 contestants
Miss Universe 2003 contestants
Panamanian beauty pageant winners
Panamanian female models
People from Panama City
Señorita Panamá
Southern Methodist University alumni